Miodrag Vlahović (born 1930) is a politician from Montenegro served as President of the Presidency of the Socialist Republic of Montenegro (within the Socialist Federal Republic of Yugoslavia) from May 1984 to May 1985. He was a member of the League of Communists of Montenegro.

References

Presidents of Montenegro
Living people
League of Communists of Montenegro politicians
Foreign Ministers of Montenegro
1930 births